Cymindis densaticollis is a species of ground beetle in the subfamily Harpalinae. It was described by Fairmaire in 1889.

References

densaticollis
Beetles described in 1889